Archibald Campbell (June 29, 1790 – July 16, 1862) was a seigneur and notary in Lower Canada.

Campbell was born in the town of Quebec in 1790, the son of merchant Archibald Campbell. He studied law with Jacques Voyer, qualified to practice as a notary in 1812 and set up practice at Quebec. He joined the local militia during the War of 1812. In 1817, Campbell married Agnes George. In 1821, he was named a King's Notary. The historian François-Xavier Garneau trained as a notary with Campbell and, during that time, took advantage of his extensive library. In 1822, Campbell purchased the seigneury of Le Bic. He helped found the Literary and Historical Society of Quebec.

Campbell died at Le Bic in 1862.

Family
Campbell's older brother John was a seigneur and merchant. His sister Louisa Sophia married seigneur Jonathan Würtele. His sister Harriet married lumber merchant William Sheppard.

Campbell's daughter Charlotte Saxton married Lower Canada physician George Mellis Douglas. His son William Darling Campbell inherited the seigneury of Le Bic and served on the municipal council for Quebec City. His youngest daughter Hilda Eliza married an English army officer, Charles Booth Brackenbury, and became a suffragette after his death.

References

External links
Biography at the Dictionary of Canadian Biography Online
Fils de Québec, troisième série, P-G Roy (1933)
Fils de Québec, quatrième série, P-G Roy (1933) - son and wife

1790 births
1862 deaths
Businesspeople from Quebec
19th-century Canadian businesspeople